Diante do Trono is a label created by Diante do Trono group. He started his work officially as a record label in 2003 and launched a solo career as gospel singers André Valadão, Nívea Soares and also CTMDT. In 2009, the label stopped distributing, but in 2014 the label again distributed.

Artists 
 Current 
 Diante do Trono
 Ana Paula Valadão
 Crianças Diante do Trono
 Israel Salazar
 Marine Friesen
 Former
 André Valadão
 Nívea Soares
 Ministério Intimidade
 CTMDT
 Trazendo a Arca

Albums distributed between 2014–present 
 Tetelestai - Diante do Trono 17 (2015)
 Alfa & Ômega - Marine Friesen (2015)
 Jesus - Israel Salazar (2015)
 Tu Reinas - Diante do Trono 16 (2014)

Albums distributed between 1998-2009 
 Amigos do Perdão - Crianças Diante do Trono (2010)
 As Fontes do Amor - Ana Paula Valadão (2009)
 Para Adorar ao Senhor - Crianças Diante do Trono (2008)
 Com Intensidade - 10 Years Diante do Trono (2008)
 A Canção do Amor - Diante do Trono 11 (2008)
 Sobrenatural - André Valadão (2008)
 Ao Vivo no Japão -  (2007)
 Príncipe da Paz - Diante do Trono 10 (2007)
 Marca da Promessa -  (2007)
 Samuel, o Menino que Ouviu Deus - Crianças Diante do Trono 6 (2007)
 En los Brazos del Padre - Spanish version of Nos Braços do Pai (2007)
 In the Father's Arms - English version of Nos Braços do Pai (2007)
 Tempo de Festa - 10 Years Diante do Trono (2007)
 Rio - Nívea Soares (2007)
 Clássicos - André Valadão (2007)
 Viver por Ti - CTMDT 1 (2006)
 Por Amor de Ti, Oh Brasil - Diante do Trono 9 (2006)
 A Arca de Noé - Crianças Diante do Trono 5 (2006)
 Alegria - André Valadão (2006)
 Fan the Fire - Nívea Soares (2006)
 Ainda Existe Uma Cruz - Diante do Trono 8 (2005)
 Vamos Compartilhar - Crianças Diante do Trono 4 (2005)
 Milagres - André Valadão (2005)
 Enche-me de Ti - Nívea Soares (2005)
 Esperança - Diante do Trono 7(2004)
 Mais que Abundante - André Valadão (2004)
 Quem é Jesus? - Crianças Diante do Trono 3 (2004)
 Reina Sobre Mim - Nívea Soares (2003)
 Quero Me Apaixonar - Diante do Trono 6 (2003)
 Amigo de Deus - Crianças Diante do Trono 2 (2003)
 Nos Braços do Pai - Diante do Trono 5 (2002)
 Brasil Diante do Trono 1 - Diante do Trono (2002)
 Crianças Diante do Trono - Crianças Diante do Trono 1 (2001)
 Preciso de Ti - Diante do Trono 4 (2001)
 Águas Purificadoras - Diante do Trono 3 (2000)
 Exaltado - Diante do Trono 2 (2000)
 Diante do Trono - Diante do Trono 1 (1998)

References 

Gospel music record labels
Brazilian record labels